Crystal Springs Reservoir is a pair of artificial lakes located in the northern Santa Cruz Mountains of San Mateo County, California situated in the rift valley created by the San Andreas Fault just to the west of the cities of San Mateo and Hillsborough, and I-280. The lakes are part of the San Mateo Creek watershed.

History
The original name of the southern or Upper Crystal Springs Reservoir was Laguna Grande, a natural lake that disappeared with the creation of the reservoir, which has a California Historical Marker ("NO. 94 Ohlone-Portolá Heritage Trail, Laguna Grande). The Portolà Expedition of 1769 camped here on November 5th. From the journal of Fray Juan Crespí, "We stopped close to a lake where there are countless ducks, geese, and so forth, in the same hollow at a half past one in the afternoon; and we have made three leagues in four hour hours and a half. Here in this hollow tracks have been encountered of large livestock, which some said were made by bears; others, by buffalo. Also a great many deer have been seen together, while the scouts aver that when they explore here, they saw whole bands of deer, and counted so many as fifty deer together in one. As we were upon the point of setting out from the spot, three very well-behaved heathens came over from the villages here, seeking us out laden with a good share of black pies and a sort of cherries that they made a present of, and they followed us along well pleased, giving us to understand we should go to their village [and] they will give us food. (A great many madroños, small and large, have been met with during these two days’ march, laden with fruits the size of so many beads off our rosaries.)" The Expedition found the native people to be most gracious, offering food and guidance. The Lamchins were a large group, probably about 350 people. Their lands in the south-central part of the Peninsula included the present cities of Redwood City and Woodside, as well as the Phleger Estate portion of the Golden Gate National Recreation Area. Their known villages, Cachanigtac, Guloisnistac, Oromstac, and Supichom, cannot be precisely located.

Today Laguna Grande is covered by the Upper Crystal Springs Lake located 2 miles south of Crystal Springs Dam on Cañada Road. The Laguna Grande place name is also shown on the 1840s diseño del Rancho Cañada de Raymundo and an 1856 plat of the Rancho de las Pulgas.

The two Crystal Springs lakes and San Andreas Lake used to be known as Spring Valley Lakes for the Spring Valley Water Company which owned them. The Spring Valley Water Company named the lakes, the Spring Valley Lakes, after the company. The original Spring Valley was between Mason and Taylor Streets, and Washington and Broadway Streets in San Francisco, where the water company started. When the company went south for more water, the Spring Valley name was carried south too.

Crystal Springs village 
Lower Crystal Springs Reservoir now covers the town of Crystal Springs which grew up around a little resort town of the same name, founded in mid-19th century and located just northwest of the present-day dam. The Crystal Springs Hotel tract was constructed around the 1860s on leased land, located four miles from the San Mateo train depot and along a stagecoach stop, and around this hotel a small town developed including a dairy and farms. The land leased for the hotel was owned by Spring Valley Water Company. In 1875, the town of Crystal Springs lost its population and business and by 1887, the location of the town was underwater because of the dam construction. There is speculation if any of the town structures were left prior to the dam completion, however according to a 1922 publication by the Spring Valley Water Company, "In the end, the entire thirty-five square miles of catchment area were swept clean of all human habitation."

Description

The entire reservoir consists of two different reservoir lakes.

The southern lake, Upper Crystal Springs Reservoir, was formed when a tributary, Laguna Creek (or Lake Creek), which joined Laguna Grande at the south end, was submerged by construction of an earthen dam (this was the first Crystal Springs Dam) in 1877. The old earthen dam became a causeway between Upper and Lower Crystal Springs Reservoirs when the latter was formed by Herman Schussler's 150 foot tall concrete Crystal Springs Dam, which dammed up San Mateo Creek to form the lower (northern) reservoir in 1888. The causeway is now crossed by Highway 92. Laguna Creek flows north through the Filoli estate and has tributaries that descend from the western slope of Edgewood County Park and the eastern slope of the Santa Cruz Mountains. In addition to Laguna Creek, Upper Crystal Springs Reservoir is fed by Adobe Gulch which descends from Cahill Ridge south of and parallel to Highway 92 into a wetland marsh then joins the reservoir at Adobe Point.

The northern reservoir, Lower Crystal Springs Reservoir, is fed by San Mateo Creek and San Andreas Creek at its north end. It also receives water from Upper Crystal Springs Reservoir via tunnels beneath Highway 92. Below Crystal Springs Dam, lower San Mateo Creek receives limited flows from Lower Crystal Springs Reservoir and descends to the Bay.

In 1924, culverts were built through Upper Crystal Springs Dam to hydraulically link Upper and Lower Crystal Springs Reservoirs.

Part of the water in the reservoirs comes from local precipitation and the rest is piped in from the Hetch Hetchy Reservoir in Yosemite National Park, as well as the Pilarcitos Creek watershed and Alameda Creek watershed. The entire reservoir was built and owned by a private company, in the form of the Spring Valley Water Company, and eventually was deeded under the ownership and protection of the city of San Francisco. This local protection has ensured the survival of important species in the area, and a set of trails in Crystal Springs Park allows many to enjoy the scenic beauty of the reservoir and the local wildlife. There are giant rainbow trout and bass in the lake. Due to decisions by the San Francisco Public Utilities Commission (SFPUC), Crystal Springs Reservoir is not open to the public.

Flora and fauna
A considerable biodiversity of flora and fauna exist in the vicinity of the reservoir, which is located within the California Floristic Province.  Among these species are a number of rare and endangered species including Acanthomintha duttonii or San Mateo thornmint, Hesperolinon congestum (Marin Dwarf Flax) and Eriophyllum latilobum or San Mateo Woolly Sunflower.

A pair of Bald eagles (Haliaeetus leucocephalus) built a nest in a Coast Douglas-fir (Pseudotsuga menziesii var. menziesii) in March 2012. This is the first bald eagle nest in San Mateo County since 1915, almost 100 years ago. Although initially unsuccessful, they have returned to their nest in the northwest corner of the Lower Reservoir.  In 2013, they successfully mated and the fledgling flew North after leaving the nest.

See also

Hetch Hetchy Aqueduct
List of dams and reservoirs in California
List of lakes in California
List of lakes in the San Francisco Bay Area
Filoli - a historic estate on the reservoir

References

External links

Reservoirs in San Mateo County, California
Hetch Hetchy Project
Reservoirs in California
Reservoirs in Northern California
Bay Area Ridge Trail